The following railways operate or operated in Anatolia, Turkey and in former lands of the Ottoman Empire.

Operating Railways

Common Carriers

Urban Railways

 Adana Metro
 Ankara Metro
 Antray
 Bursaray
 EsTram
 Samsun Tram
 İETT - Istanbul Urban Railways
 Izmir Metro
 Konya Tramway

Defunct Railways

Common Carriers

Defunct Urban Railways

External links
 http://www.trainsofturkey.com/w/pmwiki.php/History/History
 http://www.trainsofturkey.com/w/pmwiki.php/Urban.Urban

Anatolia
 
Rapid transit in Turkey
Turkey